Hey Paula is an American reality television series starring and co-produced by American television personality Paula Abdul that aired from June 28 to July 27, 2007, on the Bravo network.

Synopsis
Abdul's persona on Hey Paula was considerably less genial than that of her established reputation as "the nice one" on American Idol.  Abdul's behavior on the show, particularly toward her staff, was revealed to be less than exemplary.

Ratings and reception
In spite of the tremendous success of American Idol, the ratings for Hey Paula were reportedly low. The series averaged 520,000 total viewers since its premier.

Aftermath

During the filming of the series, Abdul was fired from the Bratz movie. Though her reaction to this was captured on camera, Abdul and her handlers subsequently denied the veracity of the segment, attributing Abdul's highly emotional on-camera break-down to "creative editing".

Episodes

References

External links
 
 Episode 1: "Forever Your Girl" Review & Recap
 Hey Paula: American Idol Judge Says ”Never Again!”

2000s American reality television series
2007 American television series debuts
2007 American television series endings
English-language television shows
Bravo (American TV network) original programming
Paula Abdul